Guadalupe District may refer to:

Peru
 Guadalupe District, Pacasmayo, in Pacasmayo province, La Libertad region

Costa Rica
 Guadalupe District, Zarcero, in the canton of Zarcero, Alajuela province
 Guadalupe o Arenilla District, Cartago , in the canton of Cartago, Cartago province
 Guadalupe District, Goicoechea, in the canton of Goicoechea, San José province

See also
 Guadalupe (disambiguation)